Ruvubu National Park is a national park in Burundi covering  that was established in 1980. Its borders fall within the provinces of Karuzi, Muyinga, Cankuzo and Ruyigi. The park touches neighboring Tanzania to the south, the valley of the Ruvubu River whose landscape dominates this area.

The Ruvubu National Park gets its name from the Ruvubu River which runs through the length of the park. The park is the last vestige of the natural grassland ecosystem which once covered the vast majority of the northeast part of Burundi. It is home to a number of wildlife species, most notably hippopotamus, Nile crocodile, Cape buffalo, waterbuck, numerous duiker species, five primate species, including olive baboon, vervet monkey, red colobus monkey, blue monkey, and Senegal bushbaby. Approximately 200 species of birds were recorded in the park.

References

National parks of Burundi
Ramsar sites in Burundi
Central Zambezian miombo woodlands